Rear Admiral Nigel Richard Benbow Berlyn AO (26 August 1934 – 17 February 2022) was a senior Royal Australian Navy officer who was general manager of the Garden Island Dockyard from 1984 to 1987.

Naval career
Born on 26 August 1934, he attended the Nautical College, Pangbourne. Berlyn then joined the Royal Navy in 1952. Between 1967 and 1970, Berlyn was senior project planner at Garden Island Dockyard before serving as a mechanical engineering officer aboard  during 1971 and 1972.

In 1973, he attended Joint Services Staff College before serving as programming and planning manager of the DDL Project. He then undertook the role of director of the Adelaide-class guided missile frigate Acquisition Project.

He retired from the RAN in 1990, having served as general manager of the Garden Island Dockyard with the rank of rear admiral between 1984 and 1987.

Berlyn died in Bowral, New South Wales on 17 February 2022, at the age of 87.

Honours and awards
 Officer of the Order of Australia (AO), 1987
 National Medal, 1981
 Member of the Order of Australia (AM), 1978

References

1934 births
2022 deaths
Australian military personnel of the Indonesia–Malaysia confrontation
Australian military personnel of the Vietnam War
English emigrants to Australia
Officers of the Order of Australia
People educated at Pangbourne College
Royal Australian Navy admirals
Royal Navy officers
Military personnel from Plymouth, Devon